The Ministry of Higher Education, Scientific Research and Innovation (MoHESRI) is the governmental body in the Sultanate of Oman responsible for supervising high education institutes and the development of high education policies in the Sultanate.

The current Minister of Higher Education is Dr Rahma bint Ibrahim Al Mahrooqi "Royal Decree 111" Appointing a Minister of Higher Education, Scientific Research and Innovation, Royal Decree No. 111/2020, issued on August 16, 2020.

History 
Prior to the establishment of MOHE, the Directorate General of Scholarship and Foreign Relations carried out a role similar to that of MOHE. After MOHE was established in 1994, the General Directorate of Scholarships and Foreign Relations was transferred from the Ministry of Education to MOHE and additional responsibilities were assigned to MOHE involving the supervision of high education institutes and the development of high education policies.

The competences of the Ministry of Higher Education were revised twice after its establishment. The initial competences were issued in 1994 and included supervision of SQU. These competences were revised again in the year 2000 removing all references to SQU, and then they were refined again in the year 2002.

Function 
The competences of MOHE are as follows:
Implementing the adopted policies in the fields of high education and scientific research.
Proposing the general policy for high education and scientific research.
Preparing future generations academically in all fields of knowledge.
Supervising high education institutes assigned to the ministry.
Proposing the mechanism for admitting students into high educational institutes supervised by the ministry.
Encouraging scientific research and supervise scientific research centers assigned to the ministry.
Implementing the scholarship law and providing the opportunities for qualified individuals to continue their high education in the fields needed by the country.
Evaluating academic qualifications and degrees granted by universities, colleges, and high educational and scientific institutes.
Surveying and registering academic degrees acquired by Omanis after the first university degree.
Undertaking the procedures for the international recognition of degrees granted by Omani high education institutes.
Following up the coordination and integration between high education institutes and research centers.
Prepare draft laws related to high education and scientific research and issuing the regulations for implementing them.
Licensing the establishment of high education institutes in Oman.
Following the decisions to admit students and other academic requirements at high educational institutes.
Participating in strengthening foreign scientific and cultural ties in the field of high education and scientific research.
Representing the Sultanate in international and regional organizations and conferences in this field.
Training Omani staff at the ministry.

Former Senior Officers 
Yahya bin Mahfooth Al Manthari - appointed as the first Minister of Higher Education in 1994.
Salim bin Mistihail bin Ahmed Al Ma'shani - appointed as Undersecretary for the Ministry of Higher Education for Scholarships and Foreign Relations Affairs in 1994, then reinstated in the same year as the Undersecretary for the Ministry of Higher Education for all matters and not only scholarships and foreign relations.
Rawia Albusaidi - from 2004 to 2020.

First Ministry Headed By A Woman 
The appointment of Rawiya Al Busaidi as the Minister of Higher Education in the year 2004 was the first appointment in the Sultanate of Oman for a woman as the head of any ministry.

References

External links 
 Ministry of Higher Education

Government of Oman